Who Can You Trust? may refer to:

 Who Can You Trust? (album), the 1996 debut album by British band Morcheeba
 An episode of Total Drama Island, a Canadian animated television series, see List of Total Drama Island episodes